The 2008 European Youth Baseball Championship was an international baseball competition held in Rome, Italy from July 15 to 19, 2008. It featured teams from Austria, Czech Republic, Germany, Italy, Lithuania, the Netherlands, Russia and Slovakia.

In the end the team from the Netherlands won the tournament.

Group stage

Pool A

Standings

Game results

Pool B

Standings

Game results

Final round

Pool C

Standings

Game results

Semi-finals

3rd place

Final

Final standings

External links
Game Results

References

European Youth Baseball Championship
European Youth Baseball Championship
2008
2008 in Italian sport